Natravis DeVone Claybrooks (born September 15, 1977) is the former head coach of the BC Lions of the Canadian Football League (CFL). He was an American football defensive tackle in the National Football League (NFL) for seven different teams (Packers, Buccaneers, Browns, 49ers, Falcons, Cowboys, and Cardinals). He also was a member of the Montreal Alouettes and Calgary Stampeders in the CFL. He has also been the  defensive coordinator for the Calgary Stampeders. On December 11, 2018, he was announced as head coach of the BC Lions, replacing the retired Wally Buono.  Claybrooks played college football at East Carolina.

Early years
Claybrooks played high school football at Bassett High School as a running back. He accepted a football scholarship from East Carolina University.

He was converted into a defensive tackle, finishing his career with 41 games (18 starts), 100 tackles (13 for loss), 11 sacks, 5 passes defensed, 3 fumble recoveries and one interception.

Professional career

NFL 
Claybrooks was signed as an undrafted free agent by the Green Bay Packers after the 2001 NFL Draft on May 18. He was waived on September 2. He was signed by the Tampa Bay Buccaneers to the practice squad but was released on October 17. On October 31, he was signed by the Cleveland Browns to the practice squad and was promoted to the active roster on November 7.

NFL Europe 
In 2002, he was allocated by the Cleveland Browns to the Rhein Fire of the NFL Europe League. On July 26, he was waived injured by the Browns.

NFL (II) 
On November 6, 2002, he was signed by the Tampa Bay Buccaneers to their practice squad and on November 15 he was promoted to the active roster. He was cut three days later and re-signed to the practice squad. He was promoted to the active roster on November 26, 2002. He was a part of the Super Bowl XXXVII winning team. He was released on August 31, 2003. On October 1, 2003, he was signed as a free agent by the San Francisco 49ers. On December 8, 2003, he was signed by the Atlanta Falcons as a free agent. He was waived on March 9, 2004. On April 27, 2004, he was signed by the Tampa Bay Buccaneers. After having a good camp, he suffered a high ankle sprain in the preseason game against the Miami Dolphins. He was waived injured on August 31. On October 5, 2004, the Dallas Cowboys signed him to the practice squad. On November 3, he was promoted to the active roster, appearing in 8 games as the backup to La'Roi Glover and Leonardo Carson at defensive tackle. He wasn't re-signed after the season. On July 30, 2005, he signed with the Arizona Cardinals. He suffered a knee injury during training camp and was waived injured on August 19.

CFL 
On January 14, 2007, he signed with the Montreal Alouettes of the Canadian Football League. The next year, he made 39 tackles (2 for loss) and 4 quarterback sacks. On August 22, 2009, he signed as a free agent with the Calgary Stampeders, registering 17 tackles (one for loss), 2 passes defensed and one forced fumble. In 2010, he was named to the CFL Western All-Stars team, after playing a key role in his team's run defense, while posting 27 tackles (3 for loss), 4 quarterback sacks and 2 passes defensed. He announced his retirement on January 18, 2012.

Coaching career

Calgary Stampeders 
From 2012 to 2015 he was the defensive line coach for the Calgary Stampeders. In 2015, he was promoted to defensive coordinator by the Calgary Stampeders.

BC Lions 
On December 11, 2018, Claybrooks was announced as the new head coach for the BC Lions. Claybrooks' tenure with the Lions was a rocky one. Despite the team's signings of Mike Reilly and Lemar Durant, The Lions failed to live up to expectations. The team struggled on both sides of the ball and posted a record of 1–10 after 11 games. He failed to record a victory against the other West Division teams. Outside of a 25–23 victory over the playoff-bound Montreal Alouettes, the majority of the team's wins were two wins against both the Toronto Argonauts and the Ottawa Redblacks, who both finished below the Lions in the overall standings. After struggling to gain traction throughout the year and posting a 5–13 record in his rookie season, Claybrooks was relieved of his duties on November 6, 2019.

CFL coaching record

Personal life
Claybrooks is a restaurant owner. His cousin Shawn Moore was a second-team All-American and played quarterback in the NFL.

References

External links
CFL bio
BC Lions bio 

1977 births
Living people
People from Bassett, Virginia
Players of American football from Virginia
American football defensive tackles
Canadian football offensive linemen
American players of Canadian football
East Carolina Pirates football players
Tampa Bay Buccaneers players
Cleveland Browns players
Rhein Fire players
San Francisco 49ers players
Atlanta Falcons players
Dallas Cowboys players
Arizona Cardinals players
Montreal Alouettes players
Calgary Stampeders players
Calgary Stampeders coaches
BC Lions coaches